Marcus Nilsson (born 7 October 1982) is a Swedish volleyball player, former member of the Sweden men's national volleyball team. 2013 CEV Champions League winner and named the Most Valuable Player and Best Scorer of the final tournament.

Sporting achievements

Clubs
 CEV Champions League 
  2008/2009 – with Iraklis Thessaloniki
  2012/2013 – with Lokomotiv Novosibirsk
 National championships
 2005/2006  French Championship, with Paris Volley
 2006/2007  Greek Championship, with Iraklis Thessaloniki
 2007/2008  Greek SuperCup, with Iraklis Thessaloniki
 2007/2008  Greek Championship, with Iraklis Thessaloniki
 2008/2009  Greek SuperCup, with Iraklis Thessaloniki

Individual awards
 2008: Greek Championship – Most Valuable Player 
 2013: CEV Champions League – Most Valuable Player 
 2013: CEV Champions League – Best Scorer
 2016: Turkish Championship – Best Server
 2016: Turkish Championship – Best Outside Hitter

References

External links
 
 Player profile at LegaVolley.it 
 Player profile at Volleybox.net

1982 births
Living people
People from Hylte Municipality
Swedish men's volleyball players
Swedish expatriate sportspeople in Italy
Expatriate volleyball players in Italy
Swedish expatriate sportspeople in Greece
Expatriate volleyball players in Greece
Swedish expatriate sportspeople in France
Expatriate volleyball players in France
Swedish expatriate sportspeople in Kuwait
Swedish expatriate sportspeople in Russia
Expatriate volleyball players in Russia
Swedish expatriate sportspeople in Poland
Expatriate volleyball players in Poland
Swedish expatriate sportspeople in Turkey
Expatriate volleyball players in Turkey
Swedish expatriate sportspeople in England
Expatriate volleyball players in England
Opposite hitters
Sportspeople from Halland County